Zospeum manitaense is a cave-dwelling species of air-breathing land snail. Some individuals in this genus were previously described under the name of Zospeum amoenum, Zospeum isselianum or Zospeum pretneri.

Description
The species has a shell height of about 1.309 mm and a shell width of 0.86–1.02 mm. Compared to its relatives the shell is broader and has a blunt tip. It is transparent, smooth and has a conical shape with 4.75–5.25 whorls and a deep suture. The peristome is roundish. The parietal wall (parietalis) is weak or totally absent in the opening (aperture).  A lamella on the columella (columellaris) is lacking. The parietal shield is well defined with a straight margin and is well differentiated from the rest of the lip. The central column of the shell (columella) shows a parietalis.

Taxonomy
The species is named after the Croatian type locality, cave Manita peć, located in Paklenica National Park.

Distribution
This species from Croatia was reported from one or two caves within Paklenica National Park and from one cave on the Crnopac Mountain.

References

Ellobiidae
Molluscs described in 2015
Endemic molluscs of the Iberian Peninsula
Endemic fauna of Spain